Memorial Stadium was a stadium in Storrs, Connecticut.  It was primarily used for American football, and was the home field of the University of Connecticut football team between 1953 and 2002. The team's current home is Rentschler Field in East Hartford. It was built for UConn's move up to the NCAA's University Division (later known as Division  I-A and now as the Football Bowl Subdivision) in college football.

The stadium held 16,200 people and was built in 1953.  It was demolished in May 2012 to make way for a new $40 million basketball practice facility, the UConn Basketball Champions Center, which opened in 2014.

References

Defunct college football venues
American football venues in Connecticut
UConn Huskies football venues
Sports venues in Tolland County, Connecticut
UConn Huskies soccer
Defunct sports venues in Connecticut
Demolished sports venues in Connecticut
1953 establishments in Connecticut
Sports venues completed in 1953
2012 disestablishments in Connecticut
Sports venues demolished in 2012
Soccer venues in Connecticut
Defunct soccer venues in the United States